Christopher Coker (born 28 March 1953) is a British political scientist and political philosopher who has written extensively on all aspects of war. He was Professor of International Relations at the London School of Economics (LSE) where he had been teaching since 1982 and retired in 2019. Despite being retired from his professorship, Coker is Director of LSE IDEAS, LSE's foreign policy think tank and continues to be a regular participant or consultant in UK and NATO military education and strategic planning circles. He is also the Director of the Rațiu Forum in Romania. He was a NATO Fellow in 1981. He was a member of Council of the Royal United Services Institute (RUSI).

Scholarship 
In his 2019 book The Rise of the Civilizational State, Coker investigates how Xi Jinping’s China and Vladimir Putin’s Russia seek to challenge Western powers and liberal international order with concepts of civilizational states.

Coker believes that war as a feature of ‘human nature’ or ‘humanity’ in general. In the 2021 book Why War?, Coker argues that war is central to the human condition and is part of the evolutionary inheritance which has allowed human to survive and thrive. New technologies such as Artificial Intelligence (AI), and new geopolitical battles may transform the face and purpose of war in the 21st century, but human's capacity for war remains undiminished. Coker concludes that human will not see the end of war until it exhausts its own evolutionary possibilities.

Works

Monographs 
Why War? (Oxford University Press, 2021)
The Rise of the Civilizational State (Polity, 2019)
Rebooting Clausewitz: 'On War' in the Twenty-First Century (Oxford University Press, 2017)
The Improbable War: China, the United States and the Continuing Logic of Great Power Conflict (Oxford University Press, 2014)
Can War be Eliminated? (Polity, 2014)
Globalisation and Insecurity in the Twenty-First Century: NATO and the Management of Risk (Routledge, 2014)
Men at War: What Fiction Tells Us about Conflict, from the Lliad to Catch-22 (Oxford University Press, 2014)
Warrior Geeks: How 21st-century Technology is Changing the Way We Fight and Think about War (Oxford University Press, 2013)
War in an Age of Risk (Polity, 2013)
Barbarous Philosophers: Reflections on the Nature of War from Heraclitus to Heisenberg (Columbia University Press, 2010)
Ethics and War in the 21st Century (Routledge, 2008)
The Warrior Ethos: Military Culture and the War on Terror (Routledge, 2007)
The Future War: The Re-Enchantment of War in the Twenty-First Century (Wiley-Blackwell, 2004)
Empires in Conflict: The Growing Rift between Europe and the United States (Royal United Services Institute for Defence and Security Studies, 2003)
Waging War Without Warriors? The Changing Culture of Military Conflict (Lynne Rienner Publishers, 2002)
Humane Warfare: The New Ethics of Postmodern War (Routledge, 2001)
Twilight of The West (Basic Books, 1998)
War And The Illiberal Conscience (Avalon Publishing, 1998)
War and the 20th Century: A Study of War and Modern Consciousness (Brassey's, 1994)
A Farewell to Arms Control: The Irrelevance of CFE (Alliance Publishers Limited, 1991)
Reflections on American Foreign Policy Since 1945 (Pinter, 1989)
British Defence Policy in the 1990s: A Guide to the Defence Debate (Potomac Books, 1987)
South Africa's Security Dilemmas (Praeger, 1987)
NATO, the Warsaw Pact and Africa (Palgrave Macmillan, 1985)
The Soviet Union, Eastern Europe, and the New International Economic Order (Praeger, 1984)
The Future of the Atlantic Alliance (Palgrave Macmillan, 1984)
US Military Power in the 1980s (Palgrave Macmillan, 1983)

Articles 
Still ‘The Human Thing’? Technology, Human Agency and the Future of War. International Relations 32.1 (2018): 23-38.
On Humanising War. Totalitarian Movements and Political Religions 1.2 (2000): 77-92.

Books chapters 
The Collision of Modern and Post-Modern War. In Yves Boyer & Julian Lindley-French (eds.) The Oxford Handbook of War (2012).
Rebooting the West: Can the Western Alliance Still Engage in War? In Christopher Browning & Marko Lehti (eds.) The Struggle for the West (Routledge, 2009).
NATO as a Post Modern Alliance. In Sabrina Petra Ramet & Christine Ingebritsen (eds.) Coming in From the Cold War: Us-European Interactions Since 1980. (Rowman & Littlefield, 2002)
Outsourcing War. In Daphné Josselin & William Wallace (eds.) Non-State Actors in World Politics (Palgrave Macmillan, 2001).

External links 
Book Reviews by Christopher Coker at Literary Review
Podcast about Christopher Coker's book The Rise of the Civilizational State (Polity Press, 2019)

References 

Living people
Academics of the London School of Economics
British political scientists
English political philosophers
20th-century British philosophers
21st-century British philosophers
1953 births
Philosophers of war